The Chieftains 5 is an album by The Chieftains, released in 1975. It was the band's first album as a professional group. Derek Bell played the tiompan (the Irish hammered dulcimer) for the first time on the album. It marked the last album appearance of Peader Mercier.

Critical reception
The New York Times called the album "highly innovative" and the music "quite descriptive," praising the "wild jigs and reels, impish hornpipes and raucous slides."

Track listing
 "The Timpán Reel" – 3:12
 "Tabhair dom do Lámh (Give me your Hand)" – 2:37
 "Three Kerry Polkas" – 2:54
 "Ceol Bhriotánach (Breton Music)" – 5:08
 "The Chieftains' Knock on the Door" – 7:16
 "The Robber's Glen" – 3:51
 "An Ghé agus Grá Geal (The Goose & Bright Love)" – 3:23
 "The Humours of Carolan" – 8:26
 "Samhradh, Samhradh (Summertime, Summertime)" – 4:07
 "Kerry Slides" – 3:45

Personnel
The Chieftains 
Paddy Moloney - Uillean pipes, tin whistle, arrangements, musical direction
Peadar Mercier - bodhrán, bones
Ronnie McShane - bones
Martin Fay - fiddle
Seán Keane - fiddle
Michael Tubridy - flute, concertina, tin whistle
Derek Bell - harp, oboe, timpani
Seán Potts - tin whistle

Charts

References

The Chieftains albums
1975 albums
Claddagh Records albums